Comex may refer to:

COMEX (NYMEX), a division of the New York Mercantile Exchange (NYMEX)
COMEX (Compagnie maritime d'expertises), a French company in undersea engineering
COMEX, a gold trust owned by iShares
Comex Group, a Mexican paint manufacturer and distributor
Commonwealth Expedition, a series of expeditions from Britain to India
Los Comex, a comic book imprint
comex, the pseudonym of Nicholas Allegra, the developer of Spirit, JailbreakMe 2.0 and 3.0, and the Nintendo Wii exploit "Bannerbomb"